Renewing Romania's European Project (REPER) is a  social liberal and pro-European political party in Romania. It is a splinter of the Save Romania Union (USR) currently led by Dragoș Pîslaru and Ramona Strugariu as acting co-presidents, founded in May 2022, in opposition to USR's current leadership under Cătălin Drulă. The party is mostly associated with former technocratic Prime Minister and former USR president Dacian Cioloș, who became the party's leader.

History

Background 

On 30 March 2018, Dacian Cioloș announced his plans to establish a new political party, called the "Romania Together Movement". However, its official registration was never finalized due to various appeals and delays in the legal process. This was abandoned in favor of the Freedom, Unity and Solidarity Party (PLUS), which was registered in December 2018 by three colleagues of Cioloș. On 26 January 2019, PLUS organized its first National Convention, where Cioloș was elected president of the party.

Soon after Cioloș took the party presidency, it was announced that PLUS will form an electoral alliance with the Save Romania Union (USR), known as the 2020 USR-PLUS Alliance, to participate together in the 2019 European Parliament election in Romania, and subsequently in the 2019 presidential election and the 2020 local and legislative elections as well.

On 15 August 2020, USR and PLUS organized a joint congress to decide whether to formally unite the two parties or not, with 84.65% of the participants voting in favor of a merger. The merger was approved by the Bucharest Court of Appeal on 16 April 2021.

In October 2021, after a joint leadership with Dan Barna, Cioloș was elected the sole president of the new party, which retained the "Save Romania Union" name. Four months later, in February 2022, Cioloș resigned as USR president after his presidential project was rejected by the party's National Bureau, with a vote of 14–11. He stated, however, that he would remain member of the party.

Formation 

On 31 May 2022, Dacian Cioloș, along with four other MEPs, resigned from the Save Romania Union (USR), criticizing the leadership of the party: "We do not see in the USR leadership either the desire or the maturity to accept the mistakes of the past and to change a direction that leads the party to political irrelevance". Cioloș and his supporters then announced the formation of a new party, more specifically "Renewing Romania's European Project" (or "REPER" for short). This announcement was met with waves of irony stemming from prominent USR members, including Bucharest Sector 1 mayor Clotilde Armand, former Justice Minister Stelian Ion, and Cosette Chichirău, as well as incumbent party president Cătălin Drulă or former party president Dan Barna.

Until the party's first congress, the party will be led by Dragoș Pîslaru and Ramona Strugariu as acting/ad interim co-presidents. Cioloș chose not to hold a position within the party leadership.

See also 

 Partidul Verde
 Volt Romania
 Renew Europe

References

External links 

 Official website (in Romanian)

Centrist parties in Romania
Liberal parties in Romania
Pro-European political parties in Romania
2022 establishments in Romania
Political parties established in 2022